Muriel Cigars is a brand of machine-rolled cigars, most recently owned by Altadis, a subsidiary of Imperial Brands.

History 
The Muriel Cigars brand was established in 1912 by Lorillard Tobacco Company in Jersey City, New Jersey. Muriel Cigars was acquired by Consolidated Cigar Holdings, Inc. in 1956, which in turn merged with Havatampa in 2000 to form Altadis USA.

The first Muriel cover girl, long considered a mystery, was an adult imagining of a child, Muriel Berry, granddaughter of Dr. Carl Moehle, owner of the lithographic firm that produced the original label. The brand chose a new model in the 1970s in an attempt to maintain relevance in changing times.

Muriel's popularity peaked in the 1950s, but Consolidated continued to market the brand extensively in America throughout the 1960s and 1970s, and the brand did $40m in annual sales by 1973, spending as much as $2.5m per year on marketing in the 1970s. Muriel Cigars ran television advertisements in the first Super Bowl in 1966. Actress Edie Adams notably worked as a pitch-lady for Muriel Cigars, appearing in multiple commercials throughout the 1960s.

Products 
 Coronella
 Coronella Sweet
 Magnum

See also 
 Cigar brands
 Edie Adams, actress and pitch-lady for Muriel Cigars
 Susan Anton, singer in Muriel Cigars commercials

References

External links 
 Muriel Cigars Commercial, 1962 & 1963
 Muriel Cigars Commercial, 1955

Cigars
Imperial Brands brands